Dimension 4 – Docking Station was the debut concert tour of South Korean girl group f(x) launched in support of their fourth studio album, 4 Walls. It consisted of three shows in Seoul, South Korea, and eight shows throughout Japan. The tour commenced at the Olympic Hall in Seoul, and concluded at the Yokohama Arena in Yokohama, Japan. A concert DVD, f(x) Dimension 4 – Docking Station in Japan, was released on July 6, 2016, in Japan.

Overview
The tour was announced by SM Entertainment on October 28, 2015, more than 6 years after f(x)'s official debut in September 2009. On December 3, 2015, SM Entertainment revealed promotional posters for the tour, and that tickets would be going on sale on December 10.

The first three concerts took place at the Seoul Olympic Park Olympic Hall, on January 29, 30 and 31. The group also performed in four cities in Japan throughout February. On holding their first solo tour, the group stated the following: 

The tour consisted of three concerts in South Korea and six concerts in Japan, and was directed by dance choreographer Shim Jae-won. Two encore concerts were held on November 2 and 3, 2016, in Yokohama, Japan. 

A total of 43,500 people attended the Japanese leg of the tour, including 16,000 people in Tokyo and 18,000 people in Yokohama. A concert in Bangkok, Thailand, originally scheduled for November 20, was canceled.

Set list
{{hidden
| headercss = background: #ccccff; font-size: 100%; width: 75%;
| contentcss = text-align: left; font-size: 100%; width: 75%;
| header = South Korea (January 29–31, 2016)
| content =  Main Set
 - "Docking Station" VCR
 "Electric Shock"
 "Red Light" (rock version)
 "Dangerous"
 "Dracula"
 - Ment
 "Gangsta Boy" / "Toy"
 "La chA TA"
 "Me+U"
 "Pinocchio (Danger)"
 "Beautiful Goodbye"
 "Sorry (Dear Daddy)" (Luna, Krystal)
 - "Fantasy of Girls" VCR (BGM: Signal)
 "Shadow" / "Sweet Witches" / "Milk"
 "Ice Cream"
 "Nu ABO"
 "Traveler" / "Zig Zag"
 "Airplane"
 "Jet"
 "Beautiful Stranger" (Amber, Luna & Krystal)
 - "A Day of KLAV" VCR (BGM: Boom Bang Boom)
 "Rainbow"
 "Pretty Girl"
 "Diamond" (Boom Bang Boom remix)
 "Rum Pum Pum Pum"
 "Step" (with "Shake That Brass" interlude)
 - "Optical Illusion" VCR (BGM: Love)
 "4 Walls"
 "Papi"
 "Deja Vu"
 "Rude Love"
 "Cash Me Out"

 "So Into U"
 "All Night"
 "Ending Page"
 "Surprise Party" (31st only - sung in celebration of Victoria's upcoming birthday)
}}

{{hidden
| headercss = background: #ccccff; font-size: 100%; width: 75%;
| contentcss = text-align: left; font-size: 100%; width: 75%;
| header = Japan (February 20–28, 2016)
| content = Main Set

 "Electric Shock"
 "Red Light" (rock version)
 "Dangerous"
 "Dracula"

 "Gangsta Boy" / "Toy"
 "La chA TA"
 "Me+U"
 "Pinocchio (Danger)"
 "Beautiful Goodbye"
 "Sorry (Dear Daddy)" (Luna, Krystal)

 "Shadow" / "Sweet Witches" / "Milk"
 "Ice Cream"
 "Nu ABO"
 "Traveler" / "Zig Zag"
 "Airplane"
 "Jet"
 "Beautiful Stranger" (Amber, Luna & Krystal)

 "Rainbow" 
 "Pretty Girl" 
 "Diamond" (Boom Bang Boom remix)
 "Rum Pum Pum Pum"
 "Step" (with "Shake That Brass" interlude)

 "4 Walls" (Japanese version)
 "Papi"
 "Deja Vu"
 "Rude Love"
 "Cash Me Out"

 "So Into U"
"Hot Summer" (Japanese version)
 "Ending Page"
}}

{{hidden
| headercss = background: #ccccff; font-size: 100%; width: 75%;
| contentcss = text-align: left; font-size: 100%; width: 75%;
| header = Japan (November 2–3, 2016) Encore
| content = Main Set

 "Electric Shock"
 "Red Light" (rock version)
 "Dangerous"
 "Dracula"

 "Gangsta Boy" / "Toy"
 "La chA TA"
 "Me+U"
 "Pinocchio (Danger)"
 "Beautiful Goodbye"
 "Sorry (Dear Daddy)" (Luna, Krystal)

 "Shadow" / "Sweet Witches" / "Milk"
 "Ice Cream"
 "Nu ABO"
 "Traveler" / "Zig Zag"
 "Airplane"
 "Jet"
 "Beautiful Stranger" (Amber, Luna & Krystal)

 "Rainbow" 
 "Pretty Girl" 
 "Diamond" (Boom Bang Boom remix)
 "Cowboy"
 "Rum Pum Pum Pum"
 "Step" (with "Shake That Brass" interlude)

 "4 Walls" (Japanese version)
 "Papi"
 "Deja Vu"
 "Rude Love"
 "Cash Me Out"

 "All Mine"
 "Hot Summer" (Japanese version)
 "Ending Page"

}}

Tour dates

DVD 

f(x) Dimension 4 – Docking Station in Japan is the first DVD release from South Korean girl group f(x). It was released on July 6, 2016, in Japan.

History
The DVD and Blu-ray features their first Asia tour, visiting more than 6 venues for a total of 11 shows. There will be two different versions: a DVD and Blu-ray version. Both editions will come with footage content, with photobook pamphlet and a tour documentary.

Track list

Release history

References

2016 concert tours